Pān is the Mandarin pinyin romanization of the East Asian surname . It is listed 43rd in the Song dynasty classic text Hundred Family Surnames.  It is romanized as P'an in Wade–Giles; Poon, Phoon, Pon, or Pun in Cantonese; Phua in Hokkien and Teochew.

In 2019 it was the 36th most common surname in Mainland China. 

潘 is also a common surname in Vietnam and Korea. It is romanized Phan in Vietnamese (not to be confused with Phạm) and Ban or Pan in Korean.

Distribution
Pan 潘 is the 37th most common surname in mainland China and the 31st most common surname in Taiwan.

None of the romanizations of Pan 潘 appeared among the 1000 most common surnames during the 2000 US census.

Origins
As with many Chinese surnames, the origins of the Pan are various and sometimes legendary.

One origin was a clan name taken from a fief north of Shaanxi granted to Ji Sun, a descendant of King Wen of Zhou. Some members descend from Ji Sun himself, others from his vassals.

Another source was a cadet branch of the ruling House of Mi of the State of Chu during the Spring and Autumn period. Among these Pans, Pan Chong served as regent and advisor for the state of Chu. When King Cheng of Chu decided to make a younger son the crown prince, Pan Chong aided the elder prince Shangchen instead.  Shangchen forced King Cheng to commit suicide and ascended the throne as King Mu of Chu.  Pan Chong was made the "Royal Tutor".

A third source in Taiwan was the adoption of the name by Taiwanese aborigines during their Sinicization. Members of the Plains tribes adopted the surname Pan as a modification of their designated status as barbarians (Fan). One family in particular became members of the local gentry, complete with a lineage to Fujian province.

List of persons with the surname

Pan
 Pan Yue (born Zhongmou, modern Zhongmu County, Henan), poet
 Pan Jixun, scholar official during the Ming Dynasty
 Pan Hannian，Chinese Politician
 Pan Men-an, Magistrate of Pingtung County
 Pan Qingfu, kung fu grandmaster
 Rebecca Pan (Poon Dik-wah, Tik-Wa Poon), Chinese-Hong Kong actress and singer
 Pan Shih-wei, Minister of Labor of the Republic of China (2014)
 Wen-Chung Pan (Pan Wen-chung), Deputy Mayor of Taichung (2014–2016)
 Will Pan, American-born Taiwanese rapper and actor
 Pan An-bang, Taiwanese singer
 Pan Jinlian, fictional character from Water Margin and The Plum in the Golden Vase
 Pan Anzi, Chinese film director
 Cindy Pan, Australian-born medical practitioner, best-selling author and media personality.
 Consort Pan, imperial consort during the Chinese dynasty Liu Song. She was Emperor Wen's concubine
 Pan Mei, Military general and statesman of imperial China's Song Dynasty.
 Pan Mei-chen, Taiwanese singer
 Princess Pan, first wife of the future Emperor Zhenzong of Song in imperial China's Song Dynasty
 Pan Shu, Empress of the Eastern Wu, consort of Sun Quan
 Pan Wei-chih, Taiwanese goalkeeper
 Pan Wen-Yuan, Chinese-American electrical engineer
 Pan Xiaoting (潘晓婷), WPBA Rookie of the Year in 2006, female professional pool player
 Pan Zhang, Eastern Han Dynasty General of the Eastern Wu under Sun Quan
 Pan Fu, Chinese politician and Premier of the Republic of China during the Beiyang government

Pua
 Tony Pua, Malaysian politician from the Democratic Action Party (DAP)
Pua Hak Chuan, Singaporean criminal and murder suspect serving 14 years in jail

Phua
 Paul Phua, Malaysian Chinese businessman and poker player
 Denise Phua, Singaporean politician and disability rights activist
 Cynthia Phua, Singaporean business executive and former politician
 Willie Phua, Singaporean news cameraman
 Phua Chu Kang, fictional protagonist of a popular Singaporean television sitcom
Phua Bah Lee, Singaporean politician

Poon
 Albert Poon, race car driver from Hong Kong, notable wins include the 1964 Macau Grand Prix, the 1963 & 1965 Malaysia Grand Prix, the 1968 Selangor Grand Prix
 Annie Poon, American animator
 Christine Poon, American business executive
 Chung-Kwong Poon (潘宗光), president of Hong Kong Polytechnic University
Dickson Poon, owner of the Harvey Nichols chain of department stores
 Poon Dik-wah, the Cantonese name of Rebecca Pan
 Joseph Poon, physicist
 Poon Lim, Chinese sailor who survived 133 days alone in the South Atlantic
 Kelly Poon, Singaporean Mandarin pop singer
 Kevin Poon,  a Hong Kong-based entrepreneur, fashion designer, event organizer, and blogger
 Richard Poon, Chinese-Filipino singer-songwriter
 Tiffany Poon, Hong Kong-born American classical pianist
 Wena Poon, a Singaporean-American novelist
 William Poon, founder of Poon's restaurants

Ban
 Ban Ki-moon (潘基文), South Korean diplomat, former UN Secretary General
 Ban Hyo-jung (潘曉靜), South Korean actress

Han
 Keiko Han, Japanese voice actress
 Megumi Han, Japanese voice actress
 Han Zenki, professional Go player

Phan
Aimee Phan, writer/novelist
Charles Phan, American chef, cookbook author, restaurateur 
Dat Phan, comedian, "Last Comic Standing" winner
John Phan, professional poker player
Joseph Phan, figure skater
Michelle Phan, makeup artist
Nam Phan, professional mixed martial artist
Nicholas Phan, tenor
Phan Thanh Giản (潘清簡), Imperial mandarin, diplomat
Phan Đình Phùng (潘廷逢), 19th century revolutionary, anti-colonial military leader
Phan Bội Châu (潘佩珠), 20th century scholar, revolutionary, anti-colonial activist
Phan Chu Trinh (潘周楨), 20th century nationalist, writer, anti-colonial activist
Phan Khắc Sửu, President of South Vietnam
Phan Huy Quát, Prime Minister of South Vietnam
Lê Đức Thọ (born Phan Đình Khải), Vietnamese Communist revolutionary, general, diplomat, and politician
Phan Văn Khải, former Prime Minister of the Socialist Republic of Vietnam
Phan Thị Kim Phúc, child subject of a Pulitzer Prize winning photograph taken during the Vietnam War
Phan Bá Vành (潘伯鑅), charismatic leader, 19th century revolutionary 
Phan Khôi, author, intellectual leader
Phan Nhiên Hạo, poet and translator
Phan Nguyên Hồng, leading authority on the mangrove ecosystem in Asia
Phan Xích Long (潘赤龍), mystic and geomancer
Phan Quang Đán, politician

References

Chinese-language surnames
Korean-language surnames
Vietnamese-language surnames
Surnames of Vietnamese origin
Individual Chinese surnames